Alex Seton (born 1977) is an Australian artist, known for his contemporary use of marble carving. He also works in sculpture, photography, video and installation.

He has been a two-time finalist in the Wynne Prize, won the Woollahra Small Sculpture Prize, and been named as the Art Gallery of NSW Director’s Choice Winner at Sculpture by the Sea three times.

In 2015, Seton was awarded a Grand Jury prize at the Fondation François Schneider ‘Contemporary Talents’ competition. He was the Inaugural Nancy Fairfax Artist in Residence, Margaret Olley Art Centre, Tweed River Art Gallery, Murwillumbah, in 2014; and in 2012 participated in the Omi International Arts Center residency program in New York.

Seton lives and works in Newtown, an inner suburb of Sydney, Australia.

Early life and education
Seton was born in Sydney, Australia. He is one of four brothers, one of whom, Ben Seton, is an actor.  He was raised in Sydney and attended the exclusive school St. Ignatius Riverview. His family's rural property is at Wombeyan Caves located in the Southern Highlands (New South Wales).

This rural upbringing saw him raised near the Wombeyan Caves Marble Quarry, which operated continuously from 1915 – 1997 before being closed due to decreasing demand and environmental concerns. Seton has credited this early exposure to marble with his interest in the medium.

His mother left Cairo in the 1960s after it had become a socialist republic under Gamal Abdel Nasser's government to settle in Australia. Growing up listening to stories of displacement fostered a strong interest in migration and his mother's relocation to Australia, something he continues to explore through his art works.

Seton honed his craft through internships and residencies with Italian carving studios, an experience that continues to influence his work. He graduated in Art History and Theory from the College of Fine Arts, University of New South Wales, in 1998.

Career
Seton is known for his use of marble and traditional carving techniques in contemporary ways, which has positioned him as one of Australia’s foremost living sculptors. He frequently works directly with contemporary political issues, such as Australia’s treatment of asylum seekers, and questions of conflict and nationhood.

In 2017, his work Refuge was included in the Kochi-Muziris Biennale (India) following exhibition in Paris in 2016 as part of The Journey at Galerie Paris Beijing.  2017 also saw a survey exhibition of Seton’s works about asylum seekers at Newcastle Art Gallery, called The Island.

In 2014 he participated in the Adelaide Biennial: Dark Heart, producing the large sculptural installation Someone died trying to have a life like mine, twenty-eight life inflatable jackets made in marble. The installation referenced an event of May 2013, in which 28 life jackets were found washed ashore the Cocos Islands, a known departure point for refugees attempting to reach Australia by boat. The work garnered critical and popular acclaim, and was acquired by the Art Gallery of South Australia.

In 2011 the Australian War Memorial acquired and commissioned the ongoing work As of today (2011–14), which is composed of one folded marble flag for every Australian casualty in Operation Slipper in Afghanistan. This work reflects Seton’s interest in Australian politics, ideas of patriotism and nationalism and the symbols attributed to them.

Seton has also regularly shown at art fairs both in Australia and internationally. He has exhibited in the last five Hong Kong and Art HK fairs, as well as participated in Sydney Contemporary, Art International Istanbul, Art Stage Singapore, Art Paris, and Art Stage Jakarta. In 2012 Seton showed his solo exhibition Elegy on Resistance at Art HK, featuring as its centerpiece Soloist (2012), a lone hooded figure sitting cross-legged.

Soloist garnered Seton considerable mainstream appeal, having been shared extensively on sites like Reddit.

Awards and prizes
 2016: Wynne Prize, Art Gallery of NSW, finalist
 2016: Talents Contemporains, Fondation François Schneider, winner
 2016: Fleurieu Art Prize, Anne & Gordon Samstag Museum of Art, finalist
 2014: Il Henraux International Sculpture Award, Querceta, Italy, finalist
 2014: University of Queensland National Artists’ Self Portrait Prize, University of Queensland, People’s Choice award
 2014: Inaugural Nancy Fairfax Artist in Residence, Margaret Olley Art Centre, Tweed River Art Gallery, Murwillumbah
 2013: University of Queensland National Artists’ Self Portrait Prize, University of Queensland, finalist
 2013: Wynne Prize, Art Gallery of New South Wales, finalist
 2012: Art OMI Australia, Art OMI International Artists Residency, New York, USA
 2009: Woollahra Small Sculpture Prize, Sydney, winner
 2009: Sculpture by the Sea, Art Gallery of New South Wales Director’s Choice Award, Sydney, winner
 2009: Prometheus Visual Arts Award, The Prometheus Foundation, Gold Coast, winner
 2008: Woollahra Small Sculpture Prize, Sydney, special commendation
 2007: Hanyu International Sculpture Cup, Shenzhen, China
 2007: The Flying Fruit Fly Circus Residency, Albury Regional Gallery, Albury
 2006: Helen Lempriere Sculpture Award, People’s Choice Award, Sydney, winner
 2005: Woollahra Small Sculpture Prize, People’s Choice Award, Sydney, winner
 2005: McClelland Sculpture Survey and Award, Langwarrin, finalist
 2004: Sculpture by the Sea, Art Gallery of New South Wales Director’s Choice Award, Sydney, winner
 2004: The Riverview Art Prize, Sydney
 2003: Sculpture by the Sea, Art Gallery of New South Wales Director’s Choice Award, Sydney, winner
 2003: Sculpture by the Sea, John Fairfax Young Artist’s Subsidy, Sydney
 2002: Sculpture by the Sea, The Australian Unrepresented Sculptor Award, Sydney, winner
 2002: Sculpture by the Sea, The Young Sculptor’s Honorable Mention, Sydney
 2002: The Sculptors Society, Sydney, Second Prize
 1997: Nescafe Big Break Award, runner up
 1994: Mosman Youth Prize First Prize and Anne Ferguson Award, Mosman Art Gallery, Sydney
 1994: Art Express, Art Gallery of New South Wales, Sydney

Collections
Seton’s work is held in numerous collections including the National Gallery of Australia; Artbank; Art Gallery of South Australia; Australian War Memorial; Newcastle Art Gallery; Bendigo Art Gallery; the Danish Royal Art Collection, Copenhagen; HBO Collection, New York; University of Queensland Art Museum; Queensland University of Technology; Albury Regional Gallery; the Patrick Corrigan Collection, Sydney; and the Art Gallery of NSW Society; as well as numerous private collections nationally and internationally.

References

External links
 Alex Seton artist website
 Sullivan + Strumpf artist page

1977 births
Living people
Australian sculptors
Australian photographers
21st-century Australian sculptors
21st-century photographers